The Most Outstanding Defensive Player Award is annually awarded to the best defensive player in the Canadian football League. The winner of the award is selected by members of the Football Reporters of Canada along with the head coaches in the CFL. The two nominees for the award are the James P. McCaffrey Trophy winner from the East Division, and the Norm Fieldgate Trophy winner from the West Division.  Between 1955 and 1973, both defensive players and offensive lineman had to compete for the CFL's Most Outstanding Lineman Award.  By the 1974 season, the league decided to make two separate awards for both defensive players and offensive lineman.

CFL's Most Outstanding Defensive Player Award winners

2022 – Lorenzo Mauldin (DE), Ottawa Redblacks
2021 – Adam Bighill (LB), Winnipeg Blue Bombers
2020 – season cancelled - covid 19
2019 - Willie Jefferson (DE), Winnipeg Blue Bombers
2018 – Adam Bighill (LB), Winnipeg Blue Bombers
2017 – Alex Singleton (LB), Calgary Stampeders
2016 – Solomon Elimimian (LB), BC Lions
2015 – Adam Bighill (LB), BC Lions
2014 – Solomon Elimimian (LB), BC Lions
2013 – Chip Cox (LB), Montreal Alouettes
2012 – J.C. Sherritt (LB), Edmonton Eskimos
2011 – Jovon Johnson (DB), Winnipeg Blue Bombers
2010 – Markeith Knowlton (LB), Hamilton Tiger-Cats
2009 – John Chick (DE), Saskatchewan Roughriders
2008 – Cameron Wake (DE), BC Lions
2007 – Cameron Wake (DE), BC Lions
2006 – Brent Johnson (DE), BC Lions
2005 – John Grace (LB), Calgary Stampeders
2004 – Anwar Stewart (DE), Montreal Alouettes
2003 – Joe Fleming (DT), Calgary Stampeders
2002 – Elfrid Payton (DE), Edmonton Eskimos
2001 – Joe Montford (DE), Hamilton Tiger-Cats
2000 – Joe Montford (DE), Hamilton Tiger-Cats
1999 – Calvin Tiggle (LB), Hamilton Tiger-Cats
1998 – Joe Montford (DE), Hamilton Tiger-Cats
1997 – Willie Pless (LB), Edmonton Eskimos
1996 – Willie Pless (LB), Edmonton Eskimos

1995 – Willie Pless (LB), Edmonton Eskimos
1994 – Willie Pless (LB), Edmonton Eskimos
1993 – Jearld Baylis (DT), Saskatchewan Roughriders
1992 – Willie Pless (LB), Edmonton Eskimos
1991 – Greg Battle (LB), Winnipeg Blue Bombers
1990 – Greg Battle (LB), Winnipeg Blue Bombers
1989 – Danny Bass (LB), Edmonton Eskimos
1988 – Grover Covington (DE), Hamilton Tiger-Cats
1987 – Greg Stumon (DE), BC Lions
1986 – James "Quick" Parker (DE), BC Lions
1985 – Tyrone Jones (LB), Winnipeg Blue Bombers
1984 – James "Quick" Parker (DE), BC Lions
1983 – Greg Marshall (DE), Ottawa Rough Riders
1982 – James "Quick" Parker (LB), Edmonton Eskimos
1981 – Danny Kepley (LB), Edmonton Eskimos
1980 – Danny Kepley (LB), Edmonton Eskimos
1979 – Ben Zambiasi (LB), Hamilton Tiger-Cats
1978 – Dave "Dr. Death" Fennell (DT), Edmonton Eskimos
1977 – Danny Kepley (LB), Edmonton Eskimos
1976 – Bill Baker (DE), BC Lions
1975 – Jim Corrigall (DE), Toronto Argonauts
1974 – John Helton (DT), Calgary Stampeders

References

See also
Norm Fieldgate Trophy
James P. McCaffrey Trophy
CFL's Most Outstanding Lineman Award

Canadian Football League trophies and awards